Shall We Travel?? (stylised as Shall we travel??) is Naoto Inti Raymi's first album released through Universal Music Japan, and second original album. It was released on July 7, 2010. Universal describes the album in the official news as a "colourful and happy sound trip."

Background
This is Naoto Inti Raymi's first album under major label Universal Music Japan. He previously released Funk Renaissance in 2002 under Sony in 2002 as Naoto, and an independent EP in 2009.

The album was released after two singles: "Carnival?" in April and "Takaramono (Kono Koe ga Naku Naru Made)" in May. "Carnival?" peaked at #34 on Oricon's single charts, and "Takaramono (Kono Koe ga Naku Naru Made)" at #15. "Takaramono (Kono Koe ga Naku Naru Made)" found success on RIAJ's Digital Track Chart, reaching #5 for three weeks and charting in the top 10 for four weeks.

Promotion

Naoto Inti Raymi performed an acoustic live at travel agency H.I.S.' Shinjuku head office on May 19, 2010.

Track listing

References

External links 
Universal Naoto Inti Raymi discography 

2010 albums
Naoto Inti Raymi albums
Japanese-language albums